Philip Klein is an American author and journalist who is the editor of National Review Online. Klein previously worked as the executive editor of the Washington Examiner, as a Washington correspondent for The American Spectator, and as a financial reporter for Reuters. He become editor of the conservative publication National Review Online in March 2021.

Early life and education 
Born Jewish, Klein grew up in New York City. He graduated from George Washington University with degrees in history and economics and has a master's degree in journalism from the Columbia University Graduate School of Journalism.

Career

Journalism
Klein is a former Reuters reporter. He worked for the American Spectator before joining the Washington Examiner in 2011. In 2014, he became the commentary editor of the same paper. In 2015, Klein was promoted to managing editor of the paper, and in 2018, he was named executive editor.

In September 2012, while Florida Congresswoman Debbie Wasserman Schultz was chair of the Democratic National Committee, Schultz accused Klein of "deliberately misquoting" her. The Washington Post fact-checked Wasserman Schultz, finding "Klein's quote was exactly accurate, meaning Wasserman Schultz falsely accused the Examiner of misquoting her. The DNC chair earns Four Pinocchios." She later refused to apologize, telling the Washington Free Beacon that: "No, I definitely will not."

In 2018, Klein reported on a tweet by Representative Alexandria Ocasio-Cortez about Department of Defense budgets which he called a "$21 trillion mistake" revealing a lack of understanding of government budgeting.

Authorship 
Klein's 2019 book, Fear Your Future: How the Deck Is Stacked Against Millennials and Why Socialism Would Make It Worse, released by Templeton Press in October 2019, was discussed on C-SPAN in November 2019. The book includes essays by other writers including David Harsanyi and Ramesh Ponnuru.

Klein's 2015 book, Overcoming Obamacare: Three Approaches to Reversing the Government Takeover of Health Care, laid out the policy approaches available to the bill's opponents.

Politics

In 2016, Klein left the Republican Party in protest over the nomination of Donald Trump, tweeting out his announcement and the completed voter registration form on 3 May 2016.

Works

References

External links 
 Philip Klein at National Review
 Templeton Press's biography of Philip Klein

Living people
American magazine editors
American male journalists
American political writers
Columbia University Graduate School of Journalism alumni
Reuters people
The American Spectator people
Columbian College of Arts and Sciences alumni
Year of birth missing (living people)